Pritchardia hardy, the Makaleha pritchardia, is a species of palm tree that is endemic to moist forests on the island of Kauai at elevations below . In 1998 only 30 individuals remained in the wild along a single trail on Kauai. This is a federally listed endangered species of the United States.

References

hardyi
Trees of Hawaii
Endemic flora of Hawaii
Biota of Kauai
Critically endangered plants
Taxonomy articles created by Polbot